Jacqueline de Jong (born 1939) is a Dutch painter, sculptor and graphic artist. She was born in the Dutch town of Hengelo to Jewish parents. Faced with the German invasion, they went into hiding. After an abortive escape attempt to England, her father Hans remained in Amsterdam while her mother and she made for Switzerland, accompanied by the Dutch painter Max van Dam. At the border they were captured by the French police, but just as they were about to be deported to the Drancy internment camp, they were rescued by the resistance, who helped them over the border. When they returned to the Netherlands following the war, Jacqueline could not speak Dutch. From 1947 on she went to school in Hengelo and Enschede (Gemeentelijk Lyceum).

In 1957 she went to  Paris and was employed in the boutique at Christian Dior in the meantime studying French and drama.
After leaving for London spring 1958 studying drama at the Guildhall School of Music and Drama, she returned to Amsterdam September 1958 – 1961 and was employed by the Stedelijk Museum, the home of Modern Art there. She visited London in 1959 where she met Danish painter Asger Jorn, the founder of the CoBrA group, They became companions. He was forty-five years old, compared to her twenty years.

She joined  the Situationist International in 1960, and started to participate in conferences and the Central committee. After the expulsion of Constant Nieuwenhuys and his group, she became the Dutch Section of the organization. She did not accept the way the German section, also known as Gruppe SPUR, had been expelled and resigned. The cleft between the Debordists and the Second Situationist International grew, however she refused to join either faction, instead stating that people should act as situationists.
Between 1962 and 1968 she edited and published The Situationist Times involving Gaston Bachelard, Roberto Matta, Wifredo Lam and Jacques Prévert in this project. In 1968 she was in Paris, printing and distributing revolutionary posters.

From starting her activities as a painter, sculptor and graphic artist  she keeps on exhibiting all over Europe and the U.S.A.
She realized wall paintings for the Amsterdam Town Hall and a separation installation for the Nederlandse Bank.

In 1970 she left Asger Jorn and moved to Amsterdam with Hans Brinkman later on a gallery owner and organiser of exhibitions and international Fairs.
They divorced in 1989. In 1990 she became the companion of lawyer Thomas H. Weyland  (Tom 1931-2009).
From 1995 Tom Weyland was on the editorial board of the International Journal of Cultural Property (de Gruyter Berlin- New York).
They got married in 1998 in Airopolie (Greece). They gave several lectures on 'intellectual right, copyright, détournement and modification' in the Netherlands and U.K.
In 1996 they bought their property in the Bourbonnais France where she has her vegetable garden and grows the potatoes which became Art ("Potatoe language" in 2003 van Abbe Museum Eindhoven invited by Jennifer Tee, "Baked Potatoes" 2006 Albisola Italy invited by Roberto Ohrt and the Golden and Platina jewellery "Pommes de Jong" 2008-2011.

In 2003 a retrospective exhibition of her work was shown at the Cobra Museum for Contemporary Art in Amstelveen, the Netherlands and the KunstCentret Silkeborg Bad Denmark, whereas a monography was published  'Undercover in de Kunst/in Art' Edition Ludion, Belgium.

Together with Tom she realized The Weyland de Jong Foundation early 2009. The main aim is to support avant-garde artists of all disciplines, architects and art-scientists having reached the age of 50 and over.

Weyland died in May 2009.

Lecture (Yale University, Beinecke Rare Book and Manuscript Library, 7 May 2012) and Exhibition (Moderna Museet Stockholm, 25 February - 8 April 2012) were planned and are realized 2009-2012.

Her Archive was purchased by Beinecke Rare Book & Manuscript Library, Yale University USA ('The de Jong Papers') in 2011.

An exhibition at the occasion on the 50th birthday of The Situationist Times (1962–2012) is planned in NYC at the Boo-Hooray Gallery, and at the Beinecke Library (Yale) and in Paris at Librairie Lecointre-Drouet in the year 2012.

References

External links
 www.jacquelinedejong.com Official website
 Jacqueline de Jong Papers. General Collection, Beinecke Rare Book and Manuscript Library, Yale University.

1939 births
Living people
20th-century Dutch women artists
21st-century Dutch women artists
Dutch activists
Dutch women activists
Dutch painters
People from Hengelo
Painters from Amsterdam
Dutch women painters